Sultan Khalil Mirza was a sultan of the Aq Qoyunlu State, ruling from 6 January 1478 to July 1478.

Life 
He was son of Uzun Hasan and Seljuk Shah Khatun. He was appointed as the governor of the Persian province during his princely years. He took power when his father, Uzun Hasan, passed away on January 6, 1478. In his early years, he had a fight with his brothers and uncle in the throne. He captured his younger half-brother Maqsud Beg (son of Despina Khatun) and executed him. His other younger full brothers Yaqub Beg and Yusuf Beg were exiled. In the same year, he defeated his uncle Murat Bey Bayandur and reached the height of his power. On the order of Sultan Yaqub, H. 14 Rebiül was executed (June 15, 1478) on a Monday.
His half-bother Ughurlu Muhammad was take by Otoman Sultan Mehmed II and married his daughter Gevherhan Hatun. Their son Ahmad Beg finally toke the throne but died in battle shortly after.

Family 
It is known that he has two sons from an unknown woman.

 Ebül Meali Ali Mirza
 Elvend Mirza

References

Sources
 
 
 
 
 

15th-century monarchs in the Middle East
1478 deaths
Aq Qoyunlu rulers